Jessica Samantha Walker (born 24 June 1990 in Brighton) is a British sprint canoeist who has competed since the late 2000s until present. She came 7th in the London 2012 K-1 200m final and 5th in the K-4 500m final. She also competed at the 2008 (K-2: 500m with Anna Hemmings) and 2016 (K-1: 200m and K-4: 500m) Olympics.

She finished 7th in the K-1 200m at the 2011 World Championships.

References

External links
 Sports-Reference.com profile

1990 births
Living people
Sportspeople from Brighton
British female canoeists
English female canoeists
Canoeists at the 2008 Summer Olympics
Canoeists at the 2012 Summer Olympics
Canoeists at the 2016 Summer Olympics
Olympic canoeists of Great Britain